Dasysphinx mucescens is a moth of the subfamily Arctiinae. It was described by Felder in 1874. It is found in Colombia.

References

Euchromiina
Moths described in 1874